Valeriy Anatoliyovych Chornyi (born 2 July 1982 in Chernihiv) is a Ukrainian football manager and former player who is the current interim manager of Ukrainian Second League club Chernihiv.

Playing career
Valeriy Chornyi, started his career in youth team of Desna Chernihiv, then played for Mena. In 2004 he moved to Metalurh-2 and he e played as a defender and midfielder  for two seasons and in 2005 he moved to Spartak Sumy. In 2006 he moved to Enerhetyk Burshtyn, then to Arsenal Kyivshchyna Bila Tserkva. In 2007 he moved to Desna Chernihiv in Polissya Dobryanka. He finished his performances in Avangard Korukivka, where he started working first as a playing coach, then as a head coach.

Managerial career
He headed Avangard in 2010-2020. On 21 April 2021 he was appointed as interim coach of FC Chernihiv, replacing Vadym Postovoy. He managed to lead the team into the 10th position in the season 2020–21 without being relegated and continue in Ukrainian Second League. On 12 September he analyzed the defeat against LNZ Cherkasy in the season 2021-22. He has been elected best Coach of Round 13 of Ukrainian Second League of the season 2021–22

Honours

Manager
Avanhard Koryukivka
 Chernihiv Oblast Football Championship: 2007, 2012, 2013
 Chernihiv Oblast Football Cup: 2011, 2013

Individual
FC Chernihiv
 Best Coach of Round 13 of Ukrainian Second League of the season 2021–22

References

External links
 Profile on Footballfact.ru

1982 births
Living people
Footballers from Chernihiv
Ukrainian footballers
Association football defenders
FC Desna Chernihiv players
FC Metalurh-2 Zaporizhzhia players
FC Spartak Sumy players
FC Enerhetyk Burshtyn players
FC Arsenal-Kyivshchyna Bila Tserkva players
FC Avanhard Koriukivka players
FC Chernihiv managers
SDYuShOR Desna players